Yamaha BW200 "Big Wheel" is a dual purpose dirt bike which was produced from 1985 to 1989. It consisted of three different model lines; the BW80, BW200 and BW350.

References

BW200
Off-road motorcycles
Motorcycles introduced in 1985